Buster: The Original Motion Picture Soundtrack is the soundtrack for the 1988 British film Buster.  The album is essentially a collection of oldies, tucked in between two Phil Collins songs that were recorded for the film, in which he starred. "Two Hearts" was specially written for the film, having earned a Grammy Award for Best Song Written Specifically for a Motion Picture or Television in 1989, a Golden Globe Award for Best Original Song (tying with "Let the River Run" from Working Girl by Carly Simon) as well as an Academy Award nomination for Best Original Song, and "A Groovy Kind of Love" with a Grammy Award nomination for Best Pop Vocal Performance, Male was a remake of a song taken to #2 in the UK Singles Chart in 1965 by The Mindbenders. Both were released as singles, and topped the Billboard Hot 100 chart, with "A Groovy Kind of Love" also reaching #1 in the UK. Other new songs include Collins' "Big Noise" and Four Tops' "Loco in Acapulco", co-written by Collins. At the Brit Awards in 1989 it won for Soundtrack/Cast Recording, while Collins received the award British Male Artist for his contribution to the soundtrack album.

"Two Hearts" and "A Groovy Kind of Love" were not released on a solo Phil Collins album until 1998's ...Hits; however, live versions appeared on his Serious Hits... Live! album in 1990.

Track listing

LP

Side A

"Two Hearts" - Phil Collins
["Gardening by the Book"]† / "Just One Look" - The Hollies
["...And I Love Her"]† / "Big Noise" - Phil Collins
"The Robbery" - Anne Dudley
"I Got You Babe" - Sonny & Cher

Side B

"Keep On Running" - The Spencer Davis Group
["Alone in Acapulco"]† / "Loco in Acapulco" - Four Tops
"How Do You Do It?" - Gerry and The Pacemakers
["Thoughts of Home"]† / "I Just Don't Know What to Do with Myself" - Dusty Springfield
["The Good Life"]† / "Sweets for My Sweet" - The Searchers
"Will You Still Be Waiting" - Anne Dudley
"A Groovy Kind of Love" - Phil Collins

Note
The album actually consists of 17 tracks. † Five tracks are preceded by incidental music performed by The London Film Orchestra and written by Anne Dudley.

CD
"Two Hearts" - Phil Collins
["Gardening by the Book"]† / "Just One Look" - The Hollies
["...And I Love Her"]† / "Big Noise" - Phil Collins
"The Robbery" - Anne Dudley
"I Got You Babe" - Sonny & Cher
["Alone in Acapulco"]† / "Loco in Acapulco" - Four Tops
"How Do You Do It?" - Gerry and The Pacemakers
["Thoughts of Home"]† / "I Just Don't Know What to Do with Myself" - Dusty Springfield
["The Good Life"]† / "Sweets for My Sweet" - The Searchers
"Will You Still Be Waiting?" - Anne Dudley
"A Groovy Kind of Love" - Phil Collins

Note
"Keep on Running" does not appear on the compact disc release (excluding the ones in the USA and Canada) for legal reasons.

Charts
Album

Singles

Certifications

References

1988 soundtrack albums
Phil Collins
Virgin Records soundtracks
Atlantic Records soundtracks
Comedy film soundtracks